Nepotilla diaphana, common name the transparent false-turrid,  is a species of sea snail, a marine gastropod mollusk in the family Raphitomidae.

Description
The length of the shell attains 4.5 mm.

Distribution
This marine species is endemic to Australia and occurs off Tasmania.

References

 May, W.L. 1920. New species of Tasmanian Mollusca, with critical remarks on several described species, and additions to the list. Papers and Proceedings of the Royal Society of Tasmania 1919: 55-69 pls 14-17
 May, W.L. 1923. An illustrated index of Tasmanian shells: with 47 plates and 1052 species. Hobart : Government Printer 100 pp.
 Powell, A.W.B. 1966. The molluscan families Speightiidae and Turridae, an evaluation of the valid taxa, both Recent and fossil, with list of characteristic species. Bulletin of the Auckland Institute and Museum. Auckland, New Zealand 5: 1–184, pls 1–23 
 Grove, S. 2011. Conidae - Rhaphitominae: Nepotilla diaphana May, 1919 ('transparent false-turrid'). A Guide to the Seashells and other Marine Molluscs of Tasmania website. https://molluscsoftasmania.org.au/project/nepotilla-diaphana/

External links
 

diaphana
Gastropods described in 1920
Gastropods of Australia